A performance supervision system (PSS) is a software system used to improve the performance of a process plant.  Typical process plants include oil refineries, paper mills, and chemical plants.

The PSS gathers real-time data from the process control system, typically a distributed control system.  Using this data, the PSS can calculate performance metrics for process equipment, controls, and operations.

References 

Business software
Industrial automation
Computing terminology